Fountainstown (historically anglicised as Ballymontane) is a coastal village in County Cork, Ireland, situated approximately 23 km south of Cork city. A seaside village, it is separated by small promontory headland from the nearby village and beach at Myrtleville.

Places of interest
As a seaside village, Fountainstown's Blue Flag beach overlooks Ringabella creek to the south.

Close to the village centre is Fountainstown House, a stately home which was originally built by the Roche family - a Norman family may have acquired lands at Fountainstown in the 15th or 16th century.

Fountainstown's pitch and putt club is sometimes considered to be the home of the sport's first course, and described by the European Pitch and Putt Association as the origin point of "modern day organised competitive Pitch and Putt".

The coast road between Fountainstown and nearby Myrtleville is used as a walk or promenade.

Transport 
Fountainstown is served by a number of bus routes, with 12 services a day to Cork, each operating via Carrigaline and Douglas, and several services operating via Crosshaven.

The nearest airport is Cork Airport.

References

See also

 List of towns and villages in Ireland

Towns and villages in County Cork
Beaches of County Cork